Educational perennialism is a normative educational philosophy. Perennialists believe that one should teach the things that are of everlasting pertinence to all people everywhere, and that the emphasis should be on principles, not facts. Since people are human, one should teach first about humans, rather than machines or techniques, and about liberal, rather than vocational topics.

Although perennialism may appear similar to essentialism, perennialism focuses first on personal development, while essentialism focuses first on essential skills. Essentialist curricula thus tends to be much more vocational and fact-based, and far less liberal and principle-based. Both philosophies are typically considered to be teacher-centered, as opposed to student-centered philosophies of education such as progressivism. Since the teachers associated with perennialism are the authors of the Western masterpieces themselves, they may be open to student criticism through the associated Socratic method, which, if carried out as true dialogue, involves a balance between teacher activity and student activity, with the teacher promoting discussion.

Secular perennialism
The word "perennial" in secular perennialism suggests something that lasts an indefinitely long time, recurs again and again, or is self-renewing. As promoted primarily by Robert Hutchins and Mortimer Adler, a universal curriculum based upon the common and essential nature of all human beings is recommended.  This form of perennialism comprises the humanist and scientific traditions. Hutchins and Adler implemented these ideas with great success at the University of Chicago, where they still strongly influence the curriculum in the form of the undergraduate Common Core.  Other notable figures in the movement include Stringfellow Barr and Scott Buchanan (who together initiated the Great Books program at St. John's College in Annapolis, Maryland), Mark Van Doren, Alexander Meiklejohn, and Sir Richard Livingstone, an English classicist with an American following.   Inspired by Adler's lectures, Sister Miriam Joseph wrote a textbook on the scholastic trivium and taught it as the Freshman seminar at Saint Mary's College.

Secular perennialists espouse the idea that education should focus on the historical development of a continually developing common oriented base of human knowledge and art, the timeless value of classic thought on central human issues by landmark thinkers, and revolutionary ideas critical to historical paradigm shifts or changes in world view. A program of studies which is highly general, nonspecialized, and nonvocational is advocated. They firmly believe that exposure of all citizens to the development of thought by those most responsible for the evolution of the occidental oriented tradition is integral to the survival of the freedoms, human rights and responsibilities inherent to a true Democracy.

Adler states: ... our political democracy depends upon the reconstitution of our schools. Our schools are not turning out young people prepared for the high office and the duties of citizenship in a democratic republic. Our political institutions cannot thrive, they may not even survive, if we do not produce a greater number of thinking citizens, from whom some statesmen of the type we had in the 18th century might eventually emerge. We are, indeed, a nation at risk, and nothing but radical reform of our schools can save us from impending disaster... Whatever the price... the price we will pay for not doing it will be much greater.

Hutchins writes in the same vein: The business of saying ... that people are not capable of achieving a good education is too strongly reminiscent of the opposition of every extension of democracy. This opposition has always rested on the allegation that the people were incapable of exercising the power they demanded. Always the historic statement has been verified: you cannot expect the slave to show the virtues of the free man unless you first set him free. When the slave has been set free, he has, in the passage of time, become indistinguishable from those who have always been free ... There appears to be an innate human tendency to underestimate the capacity of those who do not belong to "our" group. Those who do not share our background cannot have our ability. Foreigners, people who are in a different economic status, and the young seem invariably to be regarded as intellectually backward ...

As with the essentialists, perennialists are educationally conservative in the requirement of a curriculum focused upon fundamental subject areas, but stress that the overall aim should be exposure to history's finest thinkers as models for discovery.  The student should be taught such basic subjects as English, languages, history, mathematics, natural science, philosophy, and fine arts. Adler states: "The three R's, which always signified the formal disciplines, are the essence of liberal or general education."

Secular perennialists agree with progressivists that memorization of vast amounts of factual information and a focus on second-hand information in textbooks and lectures does not develop rational thought. They advocate learning through the development of meaningful conceptual thinking and judgement by means of a directed reading list of the profound, aesthetic, and meaningful great books of the Western canon. These books, secular perennialists argue, are written by the world's finest thinkers, and cumulatively comprise the "Great Conversation" of humanity with regard to the central human questions. Their basic argument for the use of original works (abridged translations being acceptable as well) is that these are the products of "genius". Hutchins remarks:

Great books are great teachers; they are showing us every day what ordinary people are capable of. These books come out of ignorant, inquiring humanity. They are usually the first announcements for success in learning. Most of them were written for, and addressed to, ordinary people.

It is important to note that the Great Conversation is not static, which is the impression that one might obtain from some descriptions of perennialism, a confusion with religious perennialism, or even the term perennialism itself.  The Great Conversation and the set of related great books changes as the representative thought of man changes or progresses, and is therefore representative of an evolution of thought, but is not based upon the whim or fancy of the latest cultural fads.  Hutchins makes this point very clear:

In the course of history... new books have been written that have won their place in the list. Books once thought entitled to belong to it have been superseded; and this process of change will continue as long as men can think and write. It is the task of every generation to reassess the tradition in which it lives, to discard what it cannot use, and to bring into context with the distant and intermediate past the most recent contributions to the Great Conversation. ...the West needs to recapture and reemphasize and bring to bear upon its present problems the wisdom that lies in the works of its greatest thinkers and in the name of love

Perennialism was a solution proposed in response to what was considered by many to be a failing educational system. Again Hutchins writes:

The products of American high schools are illiterate; and a degree from a famous college or university is no guarantee that the graduate is in any better case. One of the most remarkable features of American society is that the difference between the "uneducated" and the "educated" is so slight.

In this regard John Dewey and Hutchins were in agreement. Hutchins's book The Higher Learning in America deplored the "plight of higher learning" that had turned away from cultivation of the intellect and toward anti-intellectual practicality due in part, to a lust for money. In a highly negative review of the book, Dewey wrote a series of articles in The Social Frontier which began by applauding Hutchins' attack on "the aimlessness of our present educational scheme.

Perennialists believe that reading is to be supplemented with mutual investigations (between the teacher and the student) and minimally-directed discussions through the Socratic method in order to develop a historically oriented understanding of concepts. They argue that accurate, independent reasoning distinguishes the developed or educated mind and they thus stress the development of this faculty. A skilled teacher would keep discussions on topic and correct errors in reasoning, but it would be the class, not the teacher, who would reach the conclusions.  While not directing or leading the class to a conclusion, the teacher may work to accurately formulate problems within the scope of the texts being studied.

While the standard argument for utilizing a modern text supports distillation of information into a form relevant to modern society, perennialists argue that many of the historical debates and the development of ideas presented by the great books are relevant to any society, at any time, and thus that the suitability of the great books for instructional use is unaffected by their age.

Perennialists freely acknowledge that any particular selection of great books will disagree on many topics; however, they see this as an advantage, rather than a detriment. They believe that the student must learn to recognize such disagreements, which often reflect current debates. The student becomes responsible for thinking about the disagreements and reaching a reasoned, defensible conclusion. This is a major goal of the Socratic discussions. They do not advocate teaching a settled scholarly interpretation of the books, which would cheat the student of the opportunity to learn rational criticism and to know his own mind.

Religious perennialism
Perennialism was originally religious in nature, developed first by Thomas Aquinas in the thirteenth century in his work  (On the Teacher).

In the nineteenth century, John Henry Newman presented a defense of religious perennialism in The Idea of a University. Discourse 5 of that work, "Knowledge Its Own End", is a recent statement of a Christian educational perennialism.

There are several epistemological options, which affect the pedagogical options. The possibilities may be surveyed by considering four extreme positions - idealistic rationalism, idealistic fideism, realistic rationalism and realistic fideism.

Colleges exemplifying this philosophy
 Reed College in Portland, Oregon is a well-known secular liberal arts college which requires a year-long humanities course covering ancient Greek and Roman literature, history, art, religion, and philosophy. Students may pursue an optional extension to this core curriculum in later years.
 St. John's College (Annapolis/Santa Fe) in Annapolis, Maryland and Santa Fe, New Mexico is a secular liberal arts college with an undergraduate program described as "an all-required course of study based on the great books of the Western tradition".
 The Core Curriculum of Columbia College of Columbia University, is another well-known example of educational perennialism. 
 The University of Chicago's Common Core, established by Mortimer Adler and Robert Maynard Hutchins is another well-known example of educational perennialism. Similar to Columbia College of Columbia University, it is an uncommon example of an educational perennialistic college within a large research institution. 
The program was designed with the assistance of faculty from St. John's College, U.S.
 Thomas Aquinas College in Santa Paula, California is a Catholic Christian college with a Great Books curriculum. The college was founded by a group of graduates and professors of the Integral Program at Saint Mary's College of California, who were discouraged by the liberalism that became common place among the faculty and administration on Saint Mary's campus shortly after Vatican II.
 Gutenberg College in Eugene, Oregon provides "a broad-based liberal arts education in a Protestant Christian environment", with a "great books" curriculum emphasizing "the development of basic learning skills (reading, writing, mathematics, and critical thinking) and the application of these skills to profound writings of the past".
 Shimer College in Chicago grants a Bachelor of Arts to students who complete a program composed of humanities, social sciences, natural sciences, integrative studies and a capstone senior thesis.
 The Torrey Honors Institute at Biola University is a Christian Great Books program.
 George Wythe University in Cedar City, Utah, is an unaccredited liberal arts school.
 Thomas More College in Merrimack, New Hampshire is a Catholic College with an integrated Liberal Arts curriculum. The program includes poetry and folk, art and wood guild. The College also offers a Rome Semester, when students have the chance to study Ancient and Medieval Art & Architecture.
The Great Books Program at Benedictine College is an example of perennialism, teaching ancient, medieval, renaissance, and modern works from the Western cannon with an emphasis on Catholicism.

See also
 Philosophy of Education
 Education reform
Aristotelianism
Thomism
Paidea proposal, a reform plan initiated by Adler for public schools

References

External links

 Searle, John. "The Storm Over the University". The New York Review of Books. December 6, 1990.

Philosophy of education
Liberal arts education